St. Luke's Church may refer to:

Australia 
 St Luke's Church of England, Brisbane in Queensland
 St Luke's Anglican Church, Boyne Island in Queensland
 St Luke's Anglican Church, Toowoomba in Queensland
 St Luke's Anglican Church, Liverpool in New South Wales

Canada 
 St. Luke's United Church in Toronto, Ontario, Canada

Denmark 
 St. Luke's Church, Aarhus
 St. Luke's Church, Copenhagen

England 
St Luke the Evangelist Church, Brierfield, Lancashire
 St Luke's Church, Brislington, Bristol
 St Luke's Church, Bristol Street, Birmingham
 St Luke's Church, Charlton
 St Luke's Church, Chelsea, London
 St Luke's Church, Derby
 St Luke's Church, Dunham on the Hill, Cheshire
 St Luke's Church, Farnworth, Widnes, Cheshire
 St Luke's Church, Formby, Merseyside
 St Luke's Church, Goostrey, Cheshire
 St Luke's Church, Great Crosby, Merseyside
 St Luke's Church, Hodnet, Shropshire
 St Luke's Church, Holmes Chapel, Cheshire
 St Luke's Church, Ilford, London
 St Luke Old Street, Islington, London, a deconsecrated church now used by the London Symphony Orchestra as a music centre
 St Luke's Church, Kentish Town, London
 St Luke's Church, Kew, London
 St Luke's Church, Kingston upon Thames, London
 Church of St Luke, Liverpool
 St Luke's Church, Lower Whitley, Cheshire
 St Luke's Church, Matfield, Kent
 St Luke's Church, Oakhanger, Cheshire
 St Luke's Church, Orrell, Greater Manchester
 St Luke's Church, Pendleton, Greater Manchester
 St Luke's Church, Preston, Lancashire
 St Luke's Church, Queen's Park, Brighton
 St Luke's Church, Redcliffe Gardens, London
 St Luke's United Reformed Church, Silverhill, Hastings
 St Luke's Church, Slyne with Hest, Lancashire
 St Luke's Church, Torver, Cumbria
 Church of St Paul with St Luke, Tranmere, Merseyside
 St Luke's Church, Walton, Liverpool
 St Luke's Church, West Norwood, London, one of the Lambeth Waterloo churches
 St Luke's Church, Winmarleigh, Lancashire

Germany 
 St. Luke's Church, Munich

India 
 St Luke's Church, Patna, Bihar
 St. Luke's Church, Srinagar, Jammu and Kashmir

Iran 
 St. Luke's Church, Isfahan

Ireland 
 St. Luke's Church, Dublin

Malta 
 St Luke's Garrison Chapel
 St Luke's Chapel, Żurrieq

New Zealand 
 St Luke's Church, Christchurch

Pakistan 
 St. Luke's Church, Abbottabad, Pakistan

Romania
 St. Luke's Church, Sibiu

Scotland 
 St Luke's Orthodox Cathedral, Glasgow, Scotland
 St Luke's Church, Broughty Ferry

Sri Lanka 
 St Luke's Church, Borella, Sri Lanka
 St. Luke's Church, Piliyandala

United States 
 St. Luke's Catholic Church (Warren, Arkansas), listed on the NRHP
 St. Luke's Church, Seaford (Sussex County, Delaware)
 St. Luke's Church (Blue Ridge, Georgia)
 St. Luke's United Methodist Church (Dubuque, Iowa), listed on the NRHP
 St. Luke's Episcopal Church (Fort Madison, Iowa), listed on the NRHP
 St. Luke's Methodist Church (Monticello, Iowa), listed on the NRHP
 St. Luke's Church (Baltimore, Maryland), listed on the NRHP
 St. Luke's Church (Church Hill, Maryland), listed on the NRHP
 St. Luke's and St. Margaret's Church (Boston, Massachusetts), listed on the NRHP
 St. Luke's Church (Clermont, New York), listed on the NRHP
 Church of St. Luke in the Fields, Greenwich Village, New York City
 St. Luke's Episcopal Church (Katonah, New York), listed on the NRHP
 St. Luke's Church and Cemetery (Lincolnton, North Carolina), listed on the NRHP
 St. Luke's Church (Pritchardville, South Carolina), listed on the NRHP
 St. Luke's Church (Smithfield, Virginia), a National Historic Landmark and listed on the NRHP
 St. Luke's Episcopal Church (Vancouver, Washington)
 Saint Luke's Church Complex (Two Rivers, Wisconsin), listed on the NRHP

See also 
 Cathedral of St. Luke (disambiguation)
 Christ and St. Luke's Church, Norfolk, Virginia
 St. Luke's Episcopal Church (disambiguation)
 St. Luke's Protestant Episcopal Church (disambiguation)
 St. Luke's Methodist Episcopal Church (disambiguation)
 St. Luke's Chapel (disambiguation)
 St. Luke's Hospital (disambiguation)